PCTV may refer to:
 Communist Party of the Basque Homelands (Partido Comunista de las Tierras Vascas), separatist party in Spain
 PCTV (Penn College), TV station at Penn College, United States
Philippine Cable Television Association

See also
, includes many other "P... College/Community TV" names